Marita del Carmen Camacho Quirós (born 10 March 1911) is the former First Lady of Costa Rica when her husband Francisco Orlich Bolmarcich was president from 1962–1966. She is the first person who was a First Lady to become a supercentenarian. Camacho Quirós is the oldest living person in Costa Rica and the oldest former First Lady in the world.

Personal life
Camacho Quirós was born on 10 March 1911 in San Ramón, located within Alajuela Province. Her parents were Salustio Camacho and Zeneida Quirós, both farmers. She was their seventh daughter.

Camacho Quirós married the businessman and politician Francisco José Orlich Bolmarcich in the nearby city of Naranjo de Alajuela, on 16 April 1932. They had two sons, Francisco Orlich Camacho and Mauricio Orlich Camacho.

First Lady of Costa Rica
On 8 May 1962, Orlich  Bolmarcich became the President of Costa Rica. Upon his inauguration, Camacho Quirós became the First Lady of Costa Rica. She maintained the position until 8 May 1966 when Clara Fonseca Guardi succeeded her.

As First Lady, she actively worked for children; promoted children's shelters, teaching schools, school canteens, and community centers.

Camacho Quirós made several trips abroad with her husband as First Lady. They met with Pope John XXIII, Francisco Franco, and American presidents John F. Kennedy and Lyndon B. Johnson.

She and her husband left office as very popular and well-liked figures, with her husband being credited for stabilising a nation during the Cuban Missile Crisis.

Longevity
On 10 March 2021, Camacho Quirós turned 110 years old, becoming a supercentenarian. She has been verified by the Latin American Supercentenarians (LAS) as the oldest living Costa Rican. She is also the oldest known former first lady.

Notes

References 

1911 births
Costa Rican supercentenarians
First ladies and gentlemen of Costa Rica
Living people
National Liberation Party (Costa Rica) politicians
People from Alajuela Province
Women supercentenarians